Johan Anton ''Jan'' van Beek  ( – ) was a Dutch footballer.

Club career
Born in The Hague, Van Beek played for local side Swift as well as for Victoria Wageningen, AFC Quick Amersfoort, Quick Kampen and Frisia 1883 before leaving for the Dutch East Indies.

International career
He was part of the Netherlands national football team, playing 1 match on 1 April 1907.

See also
 List of Dutch international footballers

References

External links

1880 births
1954 deaths
Footballers from The Hague
Association football defenders
Dutch footballers
Netherlands international footballers